Trinidad Silva, Jr. (January 30, 1950 – July 31, 1988) was an American comedian and character actor who played small supporting roles in a number of films of the 1980s.

He is best known for the roles of Jesus Martinez, a gang leader in the TV series Hill Street Blues; Frog in the film Colors; and Raul, the bizarre animal lover in "Weird" Al Yankovic's first film, UHF.

Biography
Silva was born in Mission, Texas.

Death
Silva died at the age of 38 in a car crash with a drunken driver in Whittier, California. His wife and toddler son were also injured. Douglas Robert Owens pleaded guilty to vehicular manslaughter, drunken driving, and hit-and-run charges. Owens was sentenced to 10 years in state prison, which was the maximum allowed under the law.

Silva’s death occurred during production of the 1989 "Weird Al" Yankovic film UHF. Parts of the film had to be rewritten since he had not finished filming his part. The film was dedicated to his memory.

He is buried at the San Fernando Mission Cemetery in Mission Hills, Los Angeles, California.

Filmography

Film

Television

References

External links
 
 AllMovie.com

1950 births
1988 deaths
Male actors from Texas
American male film actors
American male television actors
American male actors of Mexican descent
People from Mission, Texas
Road incident deaths in California
Burials at San Fernando Mission Cemetery
20th-century American male actors